Cape Wilson is a headland in Antarctica. It is a bold, rocky, snow-covered cape, forming the south-east end of the Nash Range and marking the northern entrance point to Shackleton Inlet on the western edge of the Ross Ice Shelf. It was discovered by Captain Robert F. Scott, Royal Navy, in December 1902, on his attempted trip to the South Pole. He was accompanied on this trip by Lieutenant (later Sir) Ernest H. Shackleton, Royal Naval Reserve, and Dr. Edward A. Wilson, for whom the cape was named.

References
 

Headlands of the Ross Dependency
Shackleton Coast